The 2013 Carlton Football Club season was the Carlton Football Club's 150th season of competition, and 117th as a member of the Australian Football League. It was the first season coached by new coach Mick Malthouse, who replaced Brett Ratten after the club failed to reach the finals in 2012. Carlton finished sixth out of eighteen teams for the 2013 AFL season, after finishing eighth after the home-and-away season.

Club summary
The 2013 AFL season was the 117th season of the VFL/AFL competition since its inception in 1897; and, having competed in every season, it was also the 117th season contested by the Carlton Football Club. As in previous years, the club's primary home ground was Etihad Stadium, with home games expecting to draw larger crowds played at the Melbourne Cricket Ground, and with traditional home ground Visy Park serving as the training and administrative base. The club's two joint major sponsors, car manufacturer Hyundai and confectionery company Mars, and the club extended its deal with Mars for a further three years. Carlton continued its alignment with the Northern Blues in the Victorian Football League, allowing Carlton-listed players to play with the Northern Blues when not selected in AFL matches.

The club adopted a new clash guernsey design for 2013, which was predominantly white with navy blue monogram, numbers, shoulders and waist; the new guernsey replaced the predominantly sky blue clash guernsey which had been in use for the previous two seasons.

The club used the membership campaign slogan "I am Carlton" for the second consecutive season, after having success with the personalisable slogan in the 2012 season. The club set a new membership record of 50,564, breaking by more than 10% the previous record of 45,800 set in 2012.

Senior Personnel
There were several changes to Carlton's senior coaching panel after the 2012 season. Brett Ratten, who had coached the club since late 2007, was sacked with one year remaining on his contract after Carlton underperformed in the 2012 season, finishing tenth when a top four finish had been expected. Shortly after the season, Ratten was replaced in the role by experienced coach Mick Malthouse, who was signed to a three-year contract.

Several of Ratten's assistants also departed after 2012, and Malthouse restructured the coaching panel. Senior assistant coach Alan Richardson and midfield assistant coaches Mark Riley and Paul Williams were all sacked with time remaining on their contracts, and development coach and Northern Blues senior coach Darren Harris left the club to pursue a career in leadership consulting. Development coach Luke Webster took on the additional responsibility as Northern Blues coach for 2013.

Chris Judd opted to step down from the role of club captain, having served in the role for five seasons from 2008 until 2012; he was replaced in the role by Marc Murphy, with Kade Simpson and Andrew Carrazzo named as vice-captains. The leadership group was reduced from nine players to five, with Murphy, Carrazzo, Simpson and Jarrad Waite all holding their places from 2012 and Nick Duigan being elevated to the group for the first time.

Former club champion Stephen Kernahan continued as club president in the 2013 season, a position he had held since August 2008.

Squad for 2013
Statistics are correct as of end of 2012 season.
Flags represent the state of origin, i.e. the state in which the player played his Under-18s football.

For players: (c) denotes captain, (vc) denotes vice-captain, (lg) denotes leadership group.
For coaches: (s) denotes senior coach, (cs) denotes caretaker senior coach, (a) denotes assistant coach, (d) denotes development coach.

Playing list changes

The following summarises all player changes between the conclusion of the 2012 season and the conclusion of the 2013 season.

The 2012/13 offseason was the first in league history to allow players to switch clubs as free agents. Two players who qualified for unrestricted free agency – Jordan Russell and Bret Thornton – announced their intentions to seek other clubs following the 2012 season.

In

Out

List management

Season summary
During November 2012, the playing list attended a high-altitude training camp in Arizona. New coach Mick Malthouse had taken his team to several such training camps in Arizona while coaching at Collingwood.

Pre-season matches
2013 NAB Cup
Carlton won three of its four preliminary matches; due to its strong percentage, the club finished second on the NAB Cup ladder to qualify for the Grand Final, to play against , the only undefeated team in the preliminary rounds. Brisbane then defeated Carlton in the Grand Final by 40 points.

Home and away season
Carlton finished the season with a win–loss record of 11–11, the ninth-best record in the league. In summary:
Against the top six plus Essendon (clubs which finished with 14 or more wins), Carlton had a record of 1–9 from ten games, the sole win coming against Richmond in Round 20. Six of the nine losses were by three goals or less.
Against clubs between 7th and 13th, excluding Essendon (clubs which finished with between 9 and 12 wins), Carlton had a perfect record of 6–0.

End of the season and the effect of Essendon supplements controversy
Coming into the last two rounds of the season, Carlton needed to win both of its games to qualify for the finals; so, when Essendon won in Round 22 by six points, Carlton was eliminated from finals contention. However, during the season,  was investigated over irregularities in its supplements and sports science program, and three days after the Round 22 match, the AFL excluded Essendon from the 2013 finals series (relegating it to ninth) as part of the penalties handed down over the scandal, promoting Carlton to eighth place. Carlton then needed to win or draw, or lose and see other results fall favourably, in the final round to hold onto eighth place – and succeeded, overcoming a 39-point third quarter deficit to record a one-point victory against .

Finals
In the elimination final, Carlton faced Richmond, which was in its first finals match since 2001. Carlton trailed by 32 points early in the third quarter, before an eight-minute purple patch in which it kicked five consecutive goals to bring the margin back to one point; Carlton went on to kick six goals to two in the final quarter to win by 20 points. Sydney was a comfortable winner in the semi-final, leading by 54 points at three-quarter time before finishing with a 24-point win.

Ladder

Leading Goalkickers 
Jeff Garlett was Carlton's leading goalkicker for the season, with 43 goals. It was the first time Garlett had won Carlton's goalkicking.

Team awards and records
Game records
 Round 1 – Carlton's was defeated by Richmond for the first time since 2008, ending a nine-match winning streak against the Tigers.
First Elimination Final – the crowd of 94,690 set a new record as the highest ever to a match in the first week of the finals since prior to 1972, when the introduction of the final five meant that more than one match was played on that weekend. This record stood until 2017.

Other
 Round 7 – St Kilda hosted Carlton in a match which commemorated the 140th anniversary of St Kilda's first ever match, which took place on 31 May 1873 against the Carlton second twenty.
 Round 11 – Essendon hosted Carlton in a match which commemorated the 140th anniversary of Essendon's first ever match, which took place on 7 June 1873 against the Carlton second twenty.
 Round 23 – Port Adelaide hosted Carlton in the last AFL match ever held at AAMI Stadium. In the match, Carlton trailed by 39 points midway through the third quarter, before staging a comeback to win by one point. The win clinched eighth place and a finals berth.

Individual awards and records

John Nicholls Medal
The Carlton Football Club Best and Fairest awards night took place on 1 October. The John Nicholls Medal, for the best and fairest player of the club, as well as several other awards, were presented on the night.

John Nicholls Medal
The winner of the John Nicholls Medal was Kade Simpson, who polled 92 votes. It was Simpson's first John Nicholls Medal. Simpson won ahead of Andrew Walker and Lachlan Henderson. The top ten is given below.

Other awards
The following other awards were presented on John Nicholls Medal night:-
Best First-Year Player – Jaryd Cachia
Best Clubman – Ed Curnow
Women of Carlton Player Ambassador – Nick Duigan
The Carltonians High Achiever Award – Lachlan Henderson
Blues Coterie "Most Determined" Award – Lachlan Henderson
Inner Blue Ruthness Award – Kade Simpson

AFLPA Awards 
For each of the AFLPA awards, one or three Carlton players were nominated following internal vote of Carlton players; Marc Murphy was also nominated for the Best Captain award by default. Kade Simpson finished fifth for the Robert Rose Awards; no other Carlton player finished in his respective top five.

Leigh Matthews Trophy (Most Valuable Player)
Lachlan Henderson (nominated)
Chris Judd (nominated)
Kade Simpson (nominated)
Robert Rose Award (Most Courageous Player)
Kade Simpson (fifth place)
Best First Year Player
Troy Menzel (nominated)

Other awards
Representative honours
Eddie Betts represented the Indigenous All-Stars team in its pre-season match against .
In the 2013 International Rules Series, a two-test series held in Cavan and Dublin, Ireland, in October, Chris Yarran and Eddie Betts represented the Indigenous All-Stars team and Zach Tuohy represented Ireland.

Carlton Football Club Hall of Fame
Geoff Southby, who played 268 games for and won two premierships with Carlton between 1971 and 1984, became the twelfth player elevated to Legend status in the Carlton Football Club Hall of Fame.
David Rhys-Jones, who played 108 games for and won one premiership and a Norm Smith Medal with Carlton between 1985 and 1992, was inducted into the Carlton Football Club Hall of Fame.

Player records
Round 3 – Dylan Buckley, on his AFL debut, kicked a goal with his first kick.
Round 11 – Jarrad Waite kicked a career-high 7.1 (43) against Essendon.
First Elimination Final - Ed Curnow became the first Carlton footballer to play all 50 senior games as a rookie.

Northern Bullants 
The Carlton Football Club had a full affiliation with the Northern Blues during the 2011 season. It was the eleventh season of the clubs' affiliation, which had been in place since 2003. Carlton senior- and rookie-listed players who were not selected to play in the Carlton team were eligible to play for either the Northern Bullants seniors or reserves team in the Victorian Football League. As in 2012, home games were shared between the VFL club's traditional home ground, Preston City Oval, and Carlton's traditional home ground, Visy Park. The Northern Blues finished 9th out of 14 in the VFL, missing the final eight by four premiership points and percentage; there had been speculation that the Northern Blues could have been promoted to the eighth if the AFL and AFL Victoria had decided to exclude the eighth-placed Essendon reserves team from the VFL finals as part of the punishments for the club's supplements scandal, but the league did not apply this punishment.

References

Carlton Football Club seasons
Carlton